The Practica della mercatura (Italian for "The Practice of Commerce"), also known as the Merchant's Handbook, is a comprehensive guide to international trade in 14th-century Eurasia and North Africa as known to its compiler, the Florentine banker Francesco Balducci Pegolotti. It was written sometime between 1335 and 1343, the most likely dates being 1339 or 1340. Its original title was the Book of Descriptions of Lands; its more common name is that from its first printing in 1766. Pegolotti's work is based on his own experience as a banker and merchant for the Bardi, and on various local documents, statutes and price lists available to him.

History
No autograph survives. The sole surviving manuscript, used by all the printed editions, is that in the Biblioteca Riccardiana at Florence. It states that it was copied on 19 March 1472 by Filippo di Niccolaio Frescobaldi from a copy held by Agnolo di Lotti of Anella, who claimed it had been made from Pegolotti's original.

Pegolotti seems to have had access to an earlier, much more limited, compilation made at Pisa in 1279, now preserved in the Biblioteca Comunale at Siena, entitled Memoria de Tucte le Mercantie.

Pegolotti's work was probably used by the compiler of the Venetian trade manual Tarifa zoè noticia dy pexi e mexure di luogi e tere che s'adovra marcadantia per el mondo in the 1340s. It then served as a source for a later work which shares its title, the Pratica della mercatura compiled by Giovanni di Bernardo da Uzzano in 1442. Soon afterwards it was drawn on by the author of Libro che tracta di mercatantie et usanze de' paesi, compiled in 1458 probably by Giorgio Chiarini, afterwards incorporated in Luca Pacioli's Summa de arithmetica.

Contents

Glossary 
Glossary of terms then in use for all kinds of taxes or payments on merchandise as well as for every kind of place where goods might be bought or sold in cities (Evans, pp. 14–19). Languages listed as necessary include
Arabic ("Saracen", "Barbary")
Armenian
English
West Flemish and Brabantian (both Dutch dialects)
French (and the French of Outremer: "Cypriot", "Syrian")
Friulian
Genoese
Greek (and "Trapezuntine")
Persian
Provençal
Sardinian
Sicilian and Apulian
Spanish
"Tartar"
Tuscan
Venetian

Routes and cities 

Listing of the principal routes and trading cities frequented by Italian merchants; the imports and exports of various important commercial regions; the business customs prevalent in each of those regions; and the comparative value of the leading moneys, weights and measures.

Includes the following routes and surveys:
The journey to Gattaio (Evans, pp. 21–23), from Azov via Astrakhan, Khiva, Otrar and Kulja to Beijing (in the text these names appear as Tana, Gittarchan, Organci, Ottrarre, Armalecco, Canbalecco). The merchant is advised that he will be considered more respectable if he takes a woman with him on this journey, but she must be fluent in the Cuman language.
Coast of the Mare Maggiore
Stages from Ayas via Sivas, Erzingan and Erzerum to Tabriz in Persia (in the text these names appear as Laiazo, Salvastro, Arzinga, Arzerone, Torissi)
England and Scotland as sources of wool, listing many monasteries including Newbattle, Balmerino, Cupar, Dunfermline, Dundrennan, Glenluce, Coldingham, Kelso, Newminster near Morpeth, Furness, Fountains, Kirkstall, Kirstead, Swineshead, Sawley and Calder.
Includes main headings for the following trading places. Many others are listed incidentally. Under each heading there are lists of the main commodities with details of weights and measures, laws and customs of trade, pricing, customs duties. Pegolotti adds tables of comparison of each city's weights and measures with those of others to facilitate calculations.
Tana nel Mare Maggiore
Caffa
Torisi di Persia
Trabisonda
Gostantinopoli e Pera
Altoluogo di Turchia (Ayasoluk)
Setalia di Turchia
Erminia, chiefly Laiazo d'Erminia. Merchants of the Compagnia dei Bardi were exempt from customs duties at Ayas
Acri di Soria
Allessandria
Damietta
Cipri, chiefly Famagosta di Cipri. Pegolotti notes that he has negotiated a reduction of customs duties for the Compagnia dei Bardi and for those identified as Florentine merchants by the Bardi representative at Famagusta
Rodi
Candia di Creti
Cicilia, including Messina, Palermo
Chiarenza
Stiva (Ištip)
Nigroponte
Sardigna
Maiolica
Tunisi di Barberia
Tripoli di Barberia
Gierbi di Barberia
Vinegia
Frioli
Ancona
Puglia
Salerno
Napoli di Principato
Firenze
Pisa
Gienova
Nimissi e Monpolieri
Vignone
Aguamorta
Evizia
Borgogna
The fairs of Campagna
Parigi
Fiandra
Bruggia di Fiandra
Brabante
Anguersa. Pegolotti notes that he has negotiated equality for Florentine merchants at Antwerp with those from Germany, England and Genoa
Londra d'Inghilterra
Roccella di Guascogna
Sobilia di Spagna
Reame di Morocco di Spagna, including Niffe, Salle and Arzilla

Lists and tables 
Lengths of cloth (Evans pp. 277–286)
Fineness of gold and silver coin (Evans pp. 287–292)
Spices and their packing (Evans pp. 293–300, 307–319)
Compound interest tables (the first known tables of compound interest, Evans pp. 301–302)
Valuation of pearls and precious stones
Buying and selling grain
Shipping
Calendar tables
Fineness of gold and silver (Evans pp. 331–360)
Types and qualities of spices and other trade goods (Evans pp. 360–383)

Editions
Pegolotti's Pratica della mercatura was first published by Gianfrancesco Pagnini as part of Della Decima, his multi-volume history of the finances of Florence, in 1766. Only short sections have appeared in French and English translation. The 1936 edition by Allan Evans is now standard: it includes important glossaries of commodities, place names, coins and money, etc., but no translation.

 . 
 . 
 .
 .

Notes

References

Citations

Bibliography
Fabio Mariano, I luoghi della mercanzia:  dal palazzo medievale alla Borsa novecentesca, in: Aa.Vv., Arte, economia e territorio. Architettura e collezioni d'arte delle Camere di Commercio, Edizioni Jaca Book, Milano 2008.

Italian literature
14th-century books
Business books